William Andrew Enemark (August 23, 1913 – April 17, 2016) was a major general in the United States Army. He served as Inspector General of the U.S. Army from 1968 to 1972.

References

1913 births
2016 deaths
American centenarians
Men centenarians
People from San Francisco
Burials at Arlington National Cemetery